Alex Meschisvili was a 10-year-old boy from Veria, Greece whose parents came from Georgia. He disappeared on 3 February 2006. On 3 June 2006, the Greek press reported that five children aged 13 years of age admitted to having hit and killed the 11-year-old, only to bury his body in the open space of a private building that was ready to be demolished. The murder was the first known case of a child's murder by teenagers in the crime history of Greece.

Murder case
On 3 February, Alex had not come home after going out in a basketball field to play with some of his friends. His parents started asking around and later reported him missing. The five children he was playing with pleaded that they did not know anything at the time.
 
Four months later, and after tips from kids attending the same school as Alex, the police called the children back in for questioning, one at a time, and compared their alibis. The children each told different stories, so the police continued questioning them.  Finally, the children cracked and each individually confirmed the place where they had buried the body of Alex. As of 2017, investigators are still looking for the body.

On June 4th, 2006, the children recanted their earlier statement, saying they were bullied into admitting guilt by the police.

References

External links
 Murdered by kids his own age - Shock from the discovery (Greek)
 Article from the BBC
 Parent's blog (in Greek)
 Information about that in nikosgranturismo5 blog

1995 births
2006 deaths
2006 murders in Greece
2000s missing person cases
February 2006 events in Europe
February 2006 crimes
People from Veria
Greek murder victims
Male murder victims
People murdered in Greece
Murdered Greek children
Deaths by person in Europe
Incidents of violence against boys